Derek Michael Sanderson (born June 16, 1946), nicknamed "Turk",  is a Canadian former professional ice hockey centre and two-time Stanley Cup champion who helped transform the culture of the professional athlete in the 1970s era. The two-time Stanley Cup champion set up the epic overtime goal scored by Boston Bruins teammate Bobby Orr that clinched the 1970 Stanley Cup Finals, widely considered to be the greatest goal in National Hockey League history. Over 13 NHL seasons, he amassed 202 goals, 250 assists, 911 penalty minutes and a plus-141 rating in 598 games with five teams.

In the 1975-76 season, Sanderson scored his 32nd career short-handed goal to surpass Toronto Maple Leafs center Dave Keon as the all-time league leader. He owned the record for eight seasons. Nearly half a century after his last appearance with Boston, Sanderson still owns the Bruins team record for most career shorthanded goals (six) in the playoffs, a mark that he shares with Ed Westfall, his longtime line mate. Through the 2021-22 campaign, his 24 short-handed tallies in the regular season ranked third behind Brad Marchand and Rick Middleton in club history.

Early years
Born in Niagara Falls, Ontario, Sanderson was the son of Canadian Army Private Harold A. Sanderson, and Caroline Hall Gillespie of Dysart, Scotland. His older sister Karen was born in 1944 while their father was serving in France. In his early youth, Sanderson took to hockey, skating countless hours on a scaled-down version of an NHL rink, which his father built and maintained while his mother served hot chocolate during breaks in the action. The rink spanned two backyards of small cookie-cutter houses on lots provided at modest prices to servicemen such as Harold upon their return home.

Playing career
Sanderson played junior hockey in his hometown with the Niagara Falls Flyers of the Ontario Hockey Association. His time with the Flyers saw him being named to the Second All-Star Team in 1965–66, to the First All-Star Team in 1966–67 and winning the Eddie Powers Memorial Trophy as the top scorer in the OHA also in 1966–67. In 1964–65, Sanderson helped the Flyers reach the Memorial Cup finals where they beat the Edmonton Oil Kings in five games. After spending four years in the OHA, Sanderson turned pro by signing with the Boston Bruins of the National Hockey League in 1965–66, and made his professional debut that season by playing two games with the Bruins. Sanderson also played two games in the CPHL with the Oklahoma City Blazers in 1965–66, recording one goal.

Boston Bruins (1968–1972)
After brief stints with the Bruins in the two previous seasons, Sanderson earned a permanent roster spot in the 1967–68 campaign. The 21-year-old scored 24 goals and 49 points in 71 games. He also had 98 penalty minutes, establishing himself as something of a "tough guy" in the league. At season's end, Sanderson was awarded the Calder Memorial Trophy as the Rookie of the Year, an honor that his teammate Orr had claimed the previous year. It remains the only time in Bruins history that they had consecutive Calder Trophy winners.

Although Sanderson had been an elite scorer in junior hockey, his role with the Bruins club was limited to that of a third-liner in the middle of right wing Ed Westfall and either Wayne Carleton or Don Marcotte at the left side. It wasn't long before Westfall and Sanderson emerged as the most accomplished penalty-killing tandem in the league. If the Frank J. Selke Trophy had been given to the top defensive forward during his Bruins stint -- the award made its debut in the 1977-78 season -- it's not unrealistic to think that Sanderson would have been the recipient more than once. 

Sanderson along with the Bruins captured consecutive East Division titles in the (1970–71 and 1971–72) seasons, and won the Stanley Cup in 1971–72 against the New York Rangers, its second in three seasons.

He also received publicity for his numerous female companions and lavish ways, which included a Rolls-Royce car and circular bed. Named by Cosmopolitan as one of the sexiest men in America, he was the subject of gossip columns, a frequent guest on television talk shows.

The Flying Goal
After their series victory over the Rangers followed by a sweep of the Chicago Blackhawks in the 1969–70 playoffs, the Bruins faced the St. Louis Blues in the Stanley Cup Finals.

Forty seconds into the extra period, Sanderson controlled the puck behind the Blues goal line, at which point defenseman Bobby Orr broke in from near the blue line. His short pass found its way to Orr. The defenseman fired a short wrist shot past goaltender Glenn Hall, clinching the Bruins' first Stanley Cup in 29 years.

In 2017, on the 100th anniversary of the league, fans voted the so-called Flying Goal as the greatest in its history.  It also turned out to be the signature moment for both players in their careers.

Philadelphia Blazers (1972–1973)
In the summer of 1972, Sanderson signed what was then the richest contract in professional sports history. The Philadelphia Blazers of the new World Hockey Association signed Sanderson to a five-year, $2.65 million contract that made him the highest-paid pro athlete in the world at the time. He received $600,000 in cash as part of the agreement, an offer that the Bruins declined to match. The remainder of the money was to be spread over 10 years.

On November 1, in a game at Cleveland, Sanderson suffered a back injury when he slipped on a piece of paper on the ice. When he was fit to return weeks later, club management insisted that he remain inactive. It was widely speculated that it had hoped to prod Sanderson to bolt the team and void his lucrative deal but his contract was bought out for $800,000 after the season.

Later career
After Sanderson and the Blazers parted ways, he returned to the Bruins for two seasons but suited up for only 54 games. He was demoted to the Boston Braves of the American Hockey League for three games then traded to the rival New York Rangers.

By that time, Sanderson had developed vascular necrosis. Steroids were prescribed to alleviate the problem, but when they dried out his hip sockets, it only grew worse in nature. The pain in his hips grew so intense, he began to take barbiturates as a sleep aid.

Along with New England Patriots receiver Jim Colclough and the New York Jets star football quarterback Joe Namath, he opened Bachelors III, a trendy nightclub on New York City’s Upper East Side. Negative publicity over some of the club's less than reputable patrons led to problems and eventually Sanderson had to get out of what went from a "goldmine" to a money-losing venture.

Sanderson bounced from team to team, never being able to stay with a team for more than two full seasons. After playing with the Rangers and recording 50 points in 75 games, he was traded eight games in to the St. Louis Blues next season. In St. Louis, Sanderson set career highs in assists and points scored in a season with 43 assists and 67 points, but recurring knee and alcohol problems prompted Blues management to trade him in 1976–77 to the Vancouver Canucks in return for a first-round pick in the 1977 draft. 

Sanderson made a bad first impression with Canucks management before a regular-season game had been played. In the pre-season, he was involved in a brawl at a local strip club that left him in a hospital, where tests showed an extremely high level of alcohol as well as evidence of cocaine, sleeping pills, Seconal and Valium in his system. Sanderson scored 16 points in 16 games with the club before he was sent to the minors because of disciplinary reasons. As was the case in St. Louis, the front office grew impatient with his personal and health issues and released him after the season. 

The Pittsburgh Penguins signed Sanderson as a free agent in 1977–78. He played 13 games with the Penguins and eight more in the minors before his release. When no takers stepped forward before the next season, he retired from the game.

Personal life, health, and sportscasting career
In April 1979, Sanderson married Rhonda Rapport, a former Playboy Bunny from Chicago. Their son, Scott Leslie Sanderson, died at birth  on October 4, 1981, in Niagara Falls. According to a story in the Toronto Star by Ellie Tesher on March 21, 1982, the couple separated soon thereafter. Rhonda Sanderson's detailed questions about their son's death led to an investigation by the College of Physicians and Surgeons of Ontario.

During his career, Sanderson made several bad business investments and lost millions of dollars in the process. His partying lifestyle caught up with him by the time his career ended and he was found sleeping in an inebriated state on a bench in Central Park. By his estimate, he survived 10 hip surgeries, prostate cancer and two heart attacks.

In late 1978, Bobby Orr found his ex-teammate to be in dire straits in Chicago and checked him into a local hospital. Doctors informed Orr that his former teammate was an alcoholic and drug addict. 

Sanderson went on to become a sports broadcaster. He spent 10 years with New England Sports Network and WSBK-TV with play-by-play announcer Fred Cusick. Wanting to make sure that other hockey players would not follow his path, Sanderson organized The Professionals Group at State Street Global Advisors, where he was Director of The Sports Group that provided professional financial advice to athletes in the 1990s.

In 2012, Sanderson became the Managing Director of The Sports Group, in Boston. His team worked with athletes and high-net-worth individuals, but he is not currently listed on the company's website. His second autobiography, Crossing the Line: The Outrageous Story of a Hockey Original, written with Kevin Shea, was released in October 2012. His first autobiography, I've Got To Be Me, written with Stan Fischler, had been published in 1970. In September 2013, Sanderson received the Hockey Legacy Award from The Sports Museum at TD Garden.

Awards and achievements
 Retired as the NHL career leader in shorthanded goals (currently 11th all time)
Memorial Cup champion in 1965.
Selected to the OHA-Jr. Second All-Star Team in 1966.
Selected to the OHA-Jr. First All-Star Team 1967.
Eddie Powers Memorial Trophy (Top scorer in OHA) winner in 1967.
Calder Memorial Trophy winner in 1968.
Stanley Cup champion in 1970 and 1972.
Eddie Shore Trophy, Presented by the Gallery Gods in 1972.
7th Player Award in 1972.

Career statistics

References

Further reading

External links
 
 Official website

1946 births
Living people
Boston Braves (AHL) players
Boston Bruins players
Boston Bruins announcers
Calder Trophy winners
Canadian ice hockey centres
Ice hockey people from Ontario
Kansas City Blues players
Kansas City Red Wings players
National Hockey League broadcasters
New York Rangers players
Niagara Falls Flyers players
Oklahoma City Blazers (1965–1977) players
Philadelphia Blazers players
Pittsburgh Penguins players
St. Louis Blues players
Sportspeople from Niagara Falls, Ontario
Stanley Cup champions
Tulsa Oilers (1964–1984) players
Vancouver Canucks players
Canadian expatriate ice hockey players in the United States